The 1862 Ellesmere by-election was a by-election held on 9 June 1862 during the 3rd New Zealand Parliament in the Canterbury electorate of .

The by-election was caused by the resignation of the incumbent MP Thomas Rowley.

The by-election was won by James FitzGerald. He was unopposed.

Notes

Ellesmere 1862
1862 elections in New Zealand
Politics of Christchurch